Vicente David Conde (born October 13, 1993) is an American professional baseball shortstop who is a free agent. He played college baseball for the Vanderbilt Commodores, who won the 2014 College World Series.

Career
Conde attended Orangewood Christian High School in Maitland, Florida, and played for the school's baseball team. In 2011, his senior year, Orangewood Christian set a Florida state record for home runs.

Conde enrolled at Vanderbilt University, and played college baseball for the Vanderbilt Commodores baseball team. He played as a third baseman as a freshman, but moved to shortstop as a sophomore due to an injury to Dansby Swanson. When Swanson returned from injury, he shifted to second base due to Conde's strong defense at shortstop. In 2013, he played collegiate summer baseball with the Orleans Firebirds of the Cape Cod Baseball League. As a junior in 2014, Conde had a .284 batting average, 50 runs batted in (RBIs). He won the Gold Glove award as the nation's best defensive shortstop, as he committed four errors in 223 total chances, good for a .984 fielding percentage. Conde had a RBI during the deciding game of the 2014 College World Series, as Vanderbilt defeated the Virginia Cavaliers.

The New York Yankees selected Conde in the ninth round, with the 272nd overall selection, of the 2014 MLB draft. Conde signed with the Yankees, receiving a $155,000 signing bonus. The Yankees assigned him to play for the Staten Island Yankees of the Class A-Short Season New York–Penn League, where he batted .224 with 16 RBIs in 38 games. In 2015, he played for the Trenton Thunder, Tampa Yankees, Scranton/Wilkes-Barre RailRiders, and Charleston RiverDogs, posting a combined .233 batting average with seven home runs, 35 RBIs, and a .683 OPS in 114 combined games between the four teams. He spent 2016 with Tampa, Trenton and Charleston, batting .231 with one home run, 32 RBIs, and a .331 OBP in 84 games between the three clubs. Conde returned to those three teams in 2017, batting .141 with three home runs and 16 RBIs in 56 combined games between the teams.

On June 26, 2018, Conde signed with the New Britain Bees of the Atlantic League of Professional Baseball. He became a free agent following the 2018 season.

Personal life
Conde was born in San Juan, Puerto Rico. He grew up rooting for the Yankees and the Miami Marlins, following Derek Jeter's career closely.

References

External links

1993 births
Living people
Sportspeople from San Juan, Puerto Rico
People from Orange County, Florida
Puerto Rican baseball players
Baseball players from Florida
Baseball shortstops
Vanderbilt Commodores baseball players
Orleans Firebirds players
Staten Island Yankees players
Tampa Yankees players
Trenton Thunder players
Gigantes de Carolina players
Charleston RiverDogs players
New Britain Bees players
Scranton/Wilkes-Barre RailRiders players
Sussex County Miners players
Indios de Mayagüez players
Minor league baseball players